James Skivring Smith (February 26, 1825 – 1892) was a Liberian politician who served as the sixth president of Liberia from 1871 to 1872. Prior to this, he served as the eighth vice president of Liberia from 1870 to 1871 under President Edward James Roye and as Secretary of State from 1856 to 1860 in the cabinet of President Stephen Allen Benson. He was a member of the True Whig Party.

Smith was born in Charleston, South Carolina in 1825 to a family of free blacks. He arrived with his family in Liberia in 1833, and his parents died of malaria within a year. As a young man, he trained under Dr. James W. Lugenbeel, a medical doctor of the American Colonization Society. He then returned to the United States to study medicine at the University of Vermont College of Medicine. He transferred to Berkshire Medical College in Massachusetts, graduating with his medical degree in 1848. He was the second African American to receive a Doctor of Medicine from an American medical school, after David J. Peck a year earlier. After graduating, he returned to the newly independent Liberia to work as a physician.

In 1855, Smith was elected to the Senate, representing Grand Bassa County. From 1856 to 1860, he was Secretary of State under President Stephen Allen Benson. In the 1869 presidential election, Smith was elected vice president alongside President Edward James Roye. He and Roye were the first True Whig politicians to hold their respective offices. In 1871, after Roye was forced out of office, Smith served as president for the remainder of Roye's term. His two-month presidency remains the shortest in Liberian history. At the end of his presidential term, Smith returned home to Buchanan, and served as Superintendent of Grand Bassa County from 1874 to 1884. His son James Skivring Smith Jr. went on to serve as vice president from 1930 to 1944.

Early life and education 
Smith was born in Charleston, South Carolina on February 26, 1825, the fourth of seven children of free blacks Carlos and Catharine Smith. He and his family arrived in Liberia in 1833, and his parents died of malaria within one year of their arrival. After working with a white doctor of the American Colonization Society, Smith returned to the United States to study medicine at the University of Vermont College of Medicine. He transferred to the Berkshire Medical College in Pittsfield, Massachusetts, from which he received his medical degree in 1848. He was the second African American to graduate from a medical school in the United States, after David J. Peck, who graduated from Rush Medical College in 1847.  He then returned to the newly independent Liberia, working for the ACS as a doctor.

Politics 
Smith served as Secretary of State from 1856 to 1860 and was later elected as a senator from Grand Bassa County from 1868 to 1869. In the 1869 presidential election, Smith was elected vice president under President Edward James Roye. The two were the first True Whig politicians to hold their respective offices. On October 26, 1871, President Roye was forcibly removed from office after unconstitutionally extending his term, leading Smith to serve the remaining two months of Roye's term as president. Smith's tenure as president remains the shortest in Liberian history. After stepping down as president, Smith returned to Buchanan and served as Superintendent of Grand Bassa County from 1874 to 1884.

Smith's son, James Skivring Smith Jr., later became a successful politician in Liberia, also serving as Superintendent of Grand Bassa County and as vice president from 1930 to 1944.

References

Year of death uncertain
1825 births
1892 deaths
19th-century American physicians
19th-century Liberian politicians
19th-century Liberian physicians
African-American physicians
Americo-Liberian people
American emigrants to Liberia
Berkshire Medical College alumni
Members of the Senate of Liberia
Foreign Ministers of Liberia
People from Buchanan, Liberia
Physicians from South Carolina
Politicians from Charleston, South Carolina
Presidents of Liberia
Vice presidents of Liberia
True Whig Party politicians
19th-century African-American people